Love Songs is a 2001 compilation album by Frank Sinatra, that contains 15 love songs he recorded from Columbia Records.

Track listing
 "Falling in Love with Love" (Richard Rodgers, Lorenz Hart) - 2:45
 "(Just One Way to Say) I Love You" (Irving Berlin) - 2:30
 "I Fall In Love Too Easily" (Sammy Cahn, Jule Styne) - 3:13
 "Embraceable You" (George Gershwin, Ira Gershwin) - 3:16
 "They Say It's Wonderful" (Berlin) - 3:05
 "Fools Rush In (Where Angels Fear to Tread)" (Johnny Mercer, Rube Bloom) - 3:04
 "Everybody Loves Somebody" (Irving Taylor, Ken Lane)  - 3:15
 "Take My Love" (Jack Wolf, Joel. S. Herron, Frank Sinatra) - 3:16
 "I Am Loved" (Cole Porter) - 2:27
 "Every Man Should Marry" (Abner Silver, Benny Davis) - 3:03
 "The Right Girl for Me" (Betty Comden, Adolph Green, Roger Edens) - 3:05
 "My Girl" (Charles Freed) - 2:24
 "We Kiss in a Shadow" (Rodgers, Oscar Hammerstein II) - 3:35
 "Love Me" (Ned Washington, Victor Young) - 3:08
 "I Hear a Rhapsody" (George Fragos, Jack Baker, Dick Gasparre) - 3:04

2001 compilation albums
Frank Sinatra compilation albums